Tarun Prasad Chatterjee was an Indian politician from Indian National Congress. Previously, he was a member of Bharatiya Janata Party and Janata Dal. Chatterjee was three-time Mayor of Raipur Municipal Corporation.

In 1990, he was elected as a member of the Madhya Pradesh Legislative Assembly from Raipur Rural constituency then from November 2000 member of Chhattisgarh Legislative Assembly. He defeated Deenanath Sharma of Indian National Congress by 15,751 votes in 1998 Madhya Pradesh Assembly election.

In December 2001 he was 12 members of the state legislative assembly belonging to the Bharatiya Janata Party broke away and Chhattisgarh Vikas Party was led by Tarun Chatterji. Chhattisgarh Vikas Party was recognized by the Congress-affiliated Speaker of the assembly. The following day Chhattisgarh Vikas Party merged into the Indian National Congress.

He was appointed the Public Works Department (PWD) minister from 2002 to 2003 during the Ajit Jogi government.

He died on January 16, 2017, following a cardiac arrest. He is survived by his wife, two sons, and a daughter.

References 

2017 deaths
Year of birth missing
21st-century Indian politicians
Politicians from Raipur
Indian National Congress politicians from Chhattisgarh
Chhattisgarh MLAs 2000–2003
Bharatiya Janata Party politicians from Chhattisgarh
Janata Dal politicians
Madhya Pradesh MLAs 1990–1992
Madhya Pradesh MLAs 1993–1998
Madhya Pradesh MLAs 1998–2003